(translation "wolf's hook") or  is a heraldic charge from Germany and eastern France, which was inspired by medieval European wolf traps that consisted of a Z-shaped metal hook (called the Wolfsangel, or the Crampon in French) that was hung by a chain from a crescent-shaped metal bar (called the , or the  in French).

Early medieval pagans believed the symbol possessed magical powers and could ward off wolves. It became an early symbol of German liberty and independence after its adoption as an emblem in various 15th-century peasant revolts, and also in the 17th-century Thirty Years War. The Anti-Defamation League, and others, list the Ƶ-symbol as a hate and a neo-Nazi symbol.

Origins

Hunting tool

The  was a medieval wolf hunting technique in Europe whereby the hook was concealed inside a chunk of meat that would impale the unsuspecting wolf who ate the meat by gulping it in one movement.

The tool was further developed by attaching the hook via a chain or rope to a larger bar (often with a double crescent or half-moon shape per photo opposite) that could be lodged between the overhanging branches of a tree. The wolf would therefore be encouraged to jump up to gulp the hanging chunk of meat (with the hook concealed inside), thus further impaling itself in the manner of a fish caught on a fishing hook.

Medieval hunters were known to use "blood trails" to lead the wolf to the  trap, and also used wattle fencing nearer to the trap to create narrow channels that would guide the wolf to the trap.

Names and symbols

The stylised version of the Z-shaped  developed into a popular medieval symbol in Germany that was associated with magical powers, and was believed to have the ability to ward off wolves. The symbol appears on early medieval banners and town seals in Germany (particularly in forested regions where wolves were present in large numbers); for example, as early as 1299 the symbol can be found on seals relating to the Lords of the German Black Forest town of Wolfach (see opposite, the seal of the widow , the sole heiress of the Lords of Wolfach); and their Wolfsangel banner eventually became the municipal coat of arms for the town (see opposite). The symbol can also be found as a mason's mark in medieval stonework.

The stylised  Z-symbol (i.e. excluding the horizontal bar) bears a visual resemblance to the proto-Germanic Eihwaz rune (meaning "yew"), historically part of the ancient runic alphabet.  However, the full  Ƶ-symbol has no equivalent amongst ancient runic systems but is sometimes confused as such due to its similarity to the "gibor rune", the eighteenth pseudo rune that was created by the nineteenth-century German revivalist Guido von List as part of his Armanen runes.

Peasant revolts

Ahmed further notes that during the 17th-century Thirty Years War, groups of German militia waged a guerilla war against foreign forces under the German name , and also adopted the  symbol as their emblem; they reportedly carved the symbol on the trees from which they hanged captured foreign combatants.

In heraldry

The term "Wolfs-Angel" (German) and "Hameçon" (French) appears in a 1714 German heraldic handbook titled .

The Ƶ-design is rarer but is found in about a dozen contemporary municipal coats of arms, and is usually (but not exclusively) represented as a reversed Ƶ-shape.

In forestry

There is also evidence of its use in correspondence from the Forest Services in 1674.

In a document of 1792 regarding new uniforms, chief forester  suggested a design for uniform buttons including the letters "GR" and a symbol similar to the Wolfsangel, which he called . In Brunswick, it was prescribed for private forests and gamekeepers as a badge on the bonnet.

The  is still used in the various forest districts in Lower Saxony as a boundary marker and it is part of the emblem of the hunters' association of Lower Saxony and the club , dedicated to the breeding and training of Hanover Hounds.

In literature
The book is set in a 17th-century German farming community during the Thirty Years' War and the protagonist, a resistance fighter named Harm Wulf, adopts the symbol as his personal badge.

Wolfsangel: German City on Trial is a 2000 book by August Niro on the 1944 Rüsselsheim massacre that occurred in the city of Rüsselsheim am Main, whose coat of arms features a Wolfsangel symbol. The book draws parallels with the origins and symbolism of the Wolfsangel, particularly resistance against foreign mercenaries, and the events of the massacre.

As a Nazi symbol

In Nazi Germany, the  symbol was widely adopted in Nazi symbolism. It is not clear whether the driver of its adoption was Hitler's strong personal association with wolf imagery (the Wolf's Lair for example), or to create an association with the post-15th-century symbol of German independence and liberty, which had a particular relationship to the achievement of German freedom from foreign influence by force.

The symbol was used by a wide range of military and non-military Nazi-linked groups, including:
the 19th Infantry Division (Wehrmacht)
the 19th Panzer Division (Wehrmacht)
the 33rd Infantry Division (Wehrmacht)
the 206th Infantry Division (Wehrmacht)
the 256th Infantry Division (Wehrmacht)
the 2nd SS  Division 
the 4th SS  Division
the 34th SS Volunteer Grenadier Division 
the Sturmabteilung "Feldherrnhalle" Wachstandart Kampfrunen (Assault Unit—SA "Warlord's Hall" Guard Regiment)
the  organization
the 
the "" (Dietsch militia)
the  NSB, Dutch Nazi fascist party (whose magazine was called De Wolfsangel)
the  plan of resistance against allied occupation was intended to use this symbol.

Post-World War II symbolism

After World War II, public exhibition of the  symbol became illegal in Germany if it was connected with Neo-Nazi groups. On August 9, 2018, Germany lifted the ban on the usage of swastikas and other Nazi symbols in video games. "Through the change in the interpretation of the law, games that critically look at current affairs can for the first time be given a USK age rating," USK managing director Elisabeth Secker told CTV. "This has long been the case for films and with regards to the freedom of the arts, this is now rightly also the case with computer and videogames."

Outside of Germany, the  symbol has been used by some Neo-Nazi organizations such as in the United States where the Aryan Nations organization uses a white -like symbol with a sword replacing the cross-bar in its logo. The US-based Anti-Defamation League (ADL) database, as well as other non-governmental organisations, list the Wolfsangel as a hate symbol and as a neo-Nazi symbol.

In Ukraine, far-right movements like the Social-National Party of Ukraine and the Social-National Assembly, as well as the Azov Regiment of the Ukrainian army. have used a similar symbol of ꑭ (an elongated centre bar and the Z being rotated but untypically not reversed) for their political slogan  (Ukrainian for "National Idea", where the symbol is a composite of the "N" and the "I"); they deny any connection or attempt to draw a parallel with the regiment and Nazism. Political scientist Andreas Umland told Deutsche Welle, that though it had far right connotations, the Wolfsangel was not considered a fascist symbol by the general population in Ukraine.  The Reporting Radicalism initiative from Freedom House notes that "Accidental use of this symbol or its use without an understanding of its connotations (for example as a talisman) is rare", and ".. in Ukraine, the use of a Wolfsangel as a heraldic symbol or a traditional talisman would be uncharacteristic".

In 2020, there was a brief trend of Generation Z TikTok users tattooing a "Generation Ƶ" symbol on the arm as "a symbol of unity in our generation but also as a sign of rebellion" (in the manner of the 15th-century peasant's revolts). The originator of the trend later renounced it when the use of the symbol by the Nazis was brought to her attention.

See also

 List of heraldic charges
 List of symbols designated by the Anti-Defamation League as hate symbols
 Fascist symbolism
 Modern runic writing
 Wolf hunting
 Z with stroke

References

Sources
 
 

Heraldic charges
Superstitions of Europe
Early Germanic symbols
Talismans
Magic symbols
Objects believed to protect from evil
Boundary markers
Masonic symbolism
Wolf hunting
Hunting equipment
Hunting in Germany
Hunting in France
German Peasants' War
Thirty Years' War in popular culture
Germanic paganism
Germanic mysticism
German folklore
Nazi symbolism
Fascist symbols
Neo-Nazism in Ukraine